Sladki Vrh is a rural settlement in the Municipality of Šentilj in northeastern Slovenia, on the Austrian border. The main part of the settlement is concentrated on the right bank of the Mura River with the remainder dispersed in the Slovene Hills to the south. A tissue paper manufacturer, Paloma, operates in the settlement.

References

External links
Sladki Vrh on Geopedia

Populated places in the Municipality of Šentilj